Coleophora pappiferella is a moth of the family Coleophoridae found in Europe.

Description
The wingspan is 11–14 mm. Coleophora pappiferella can only be reliably identified by dissection and microscopic examination of the genitalia.

The larvae feed on mountain everlasting (Antennaria dioica), Gnaphalium vulgare and possibly cudweeds (Filago species). They feed on the flowers and later the fruits of their host plant and live within a movable case.

Distribution
It is found in Ireland, Scotland Fennoscandia, northern Russia, Estonia, Lithuania, Poland, Denmark, Germany, France, Switzerland, Austria, the Czech Republic, Slovakia, Romania and Italy.

References

External links
 Bestimmungshilfe für die in Europa nachgewiesenen Schmetterlingsarten
  Images representing Coleophora pappiferella at Consortium for the Barcode of Life

pappiferella
Moths described in 1869
Moths of Europe
Taxa named by Ottmar Hofmann